Abraham Paz Cruz (born 29 June 1979) is a Spanish former professional footballer who played as a central defender, currently manager of St Joseph's in the Gibraltar National League.

Playing career
Born in El Puerto de Santa María, Province of Cádiz, Paz began his career his professional with the reserves of local club Cádiz CF, his stint then also being punctuated by a loan to hometown's Racing Club Portuense. He was definitely reinstated in the first team in 2000, going on to represent them in all three major divisions (including 22 games and one goal in 2005–06's La Liga).

Paz joined Hércules CF of the Segunda División in the summer of 2008. He contributed 31 matches and two goals in his second season, as the Alicante side returned to the top division after a 13-year absence.

On 12 December 2010, during a 4–1 home win against Málaga CF, Paz became the first Spanish scorer for Hércules in 2010–11, as the campaign ended in immediate relegation. From 2011 to 2013 he competed in the second tier, representing FC Cartagena and CE Sabadell FC and suffering relegation with the former.

On 16 July 2013, aged 34, Paz moved abroad for the very first time, signing a two-year contract with Israeli club Bnei Sakhnin FC– he had just been banned from playing in his country while investigations were carried out to determine whether or not he was involved in match fixing when he represented Hércules. During his spell in the Holy Land, he was also loaned to fellow Premier League team Maccabi Haifa FC; ultimately, he was acquitted of any wrongdoing.

In January 2019, Paz joined St Joseph's F.C. of the Gibraltar Premier Division on a short-team deal.

Coaching career
Shortly after retiring, Paz became assistant manager at Atlético Sanluqueño CF. He had his first head coach job on 8 June 2022, being appointed at former side St Joseph's.

Career statistics

Honours
Cádiz
Segunda División: 2004–05

References

External links

Stats and bio at Cadistas1910 

1979 births
Living people
People from El Puerto de Santa María
Sportspeople from the Province of Cádiz
Spanish footballers
Footballers from Andalusia
Association football defenders
La Liga players
Segunda División players
Segunda División B players
Tercera División players
Cádiz CF B players
Cádiz CF players
Racing Club Portuense players
Hércules CF players
FC Cartagena footballers
CE Sabadell FC footballers
Israeli Premier League players
Bnei Sakhnin F.C. players
Maccabi Haifa F.C. players
Gibraltar Premier Division players
St Joseph's F.C. players
Spanish expatriate footballers
Expatriate footballers in Israel
Expatriate footballers in Gibraltar
Spanish expatriate sportspeople in Israel
Spanish expatriate sportspeople in Gibraltar
Spanish football managers
Spanish expatriate football managers
Expatriate football managers in Gibraltar